"Love Ain't Here Anymore" is a song by English boy band Take That. Released on 27 June 1994, it was the sixth and final single taken from the band's second studio album, Everything Changes (1993). It peaked at number three in the UK Singles Chart, ending their string of consecutive number-one singles. It failed to overtake Wet Wet Wet's cover of "Love Is All Around" at number one, and American R&B group, All-4-One, who reached number two with "I Swear". The song was re-recorded for release in the United States and included on their first Greatest Hits compilation in 1996.

Take That also recorded a Spanish version of the song, "No si aqui no hay amor", which entered the Spanish AFYVE chart at number two. It appears as a B-side to Take That's following single, "Sure", while the English version appears on the United States single of "Back for Good". "Love Ain't Here Anymore" has received a silver sales status certification for sales of over 200,000 copies in the UK. A new, re-recorded version of the song appears as a track on the group's 2018 compilation album Odyssey, featuring vocals from US singing group Boyz II Men.

Critical reception
Peter Fawthrop from AllMusic described the song as a "quality ballad". A reviewer from Music & Media wrote, "Teenage girls can't play with dolls all the time. Actually they're in for a bit of romance too, and dreams about future loves are given some contours by Take That's sophisticated ballad." Alan Jones from Music Week gave it five out of five, picking it as the Pick of the Week. He stated, "With this warm and tender ballad, Take That are set to become the third act to have five chart-toppers inside a 12-month period, following in the illustrious footsteps of Elvis Presley and the Beatles." Pop Rescue commented, "Turn the lights down for Love Ain’t Here Anymore, with Gary singing his regrets out". They also deemed it "a mid-tempo ballad, with soaring strings that fit perfectly with the vocal range of the group".

Music video
A music video was made to accompany the song. It shows the band performing the song in what appears to be a recording studio. Lighting effects are used to make the video more complex and appealing showing silhouettes of the band.

Track listings
"Rock 'n' Roll Medley" contains versions of "Great Balls of Fire", "Under the Moon of Love", "(Let Me Be Your) Teddy Bear", and "Born to Hand Jive".

 UK CD1 and Japanese CD single 
 "Love Ain't Here Anymore" – 3:48
 "The Party Remix" – 7:13
 "Another Crack in My Heart" (live) – 3:02
 "Everything Changes" (live Top of the Pops satellite performance) – 4:25

 UK CD2 
 "Love Ain't Here Anymore" (live at Berlin Deutschlandhalle)
 "Rock 'n' Roll Medley" (live at Berlin Deutschlandhalle)
 "Wasting My Time" (live at Berlin Deutschlandhalle)
 "Babe" (live at Berlin Deutschlandhalle)

 UK cassette single 1 
 "Love Ain't Here Anymore"
 "The Party Remix"
 "Everything Changes" (live Top of the Pops satellite performance)

 UK cassette single 2 
 "Love Ain't Here Anymore" (live at Berlin Deutschlandhalle)
 "Rock 'n' Roll Medley" (live at Berlin Deutschlandhalle)
 "Babe" (live at Berlin Deutschlandhalle)

 European CD single 
 "Love Ain't Here Anymore"
 "The Party Remix"

 Australasian CD single 
 "Love Ain't Here Anymore"
 "The Party Remix"
 "Babe" (live at Berlin Deutschlandhalle)

 Spanish CD single 
 "No si aqui no hay amor"
 "The Party Remix"
 "Love Ain't Here Anymore"
 "Babe" (live at Berlin Deutschlandhalle)

 Spanish 12-inch single 
 "No si aqui no hay amor" – 3:54
 "The Party Remix" – 7:25
 "Love Ain't Here Anymore" – 3:51
 "Babe" (live at Berlin Deutschlandhalle) – 6:24
 "Rock 'n' Roll Medley" (live at Berlin Deutschlandhalle) – 6:37

Personnel
 Gary Barlow – lead vocals
 Howard Donald – backing vocals
 Jason Orange – backing vocals
 Mark Owen – backing vocals
 Robbie Williams – backing vocals

Charts and certifications

Weekly charts

Year-end charts

Certifications

References

Take That songs
1993 songs
1994 singles
Pop ballads
RCA Records singles
Songs written by Gary Barlow